Ángel Martín González (born 28 April 1964) is a Spanish former footballer who played mostly as a defensive midfielder.

Playing career
Born in Madrid, Martín González was brought up in the Real Madrid youth system, and would subsequently represent Spain at various youth levels. Having been almost exclusively associated with the club's reserves during his spell, he was loaned to fellow La Liga side CA Osasuna in January 1986. He only appeared in five matches during his first season in Navarre, but was instrumental in helping the team avoid relegation in the last round at the expense of Valencia CF.

Martín González became an undisputed starter from the 1988–89 campaign onwards. Alongside namesake Martín Domínguez, he helped to a fourth-place finish in 1990–91 – playing all but one of the games – with the subsequent qualification to the UEFA Cup.

After a final season with Osasuna, filled with injuries and spent in the second division, Martín González returned to the capital in summer 1995 with lowly Rayo Vallecano, for a further two top-flight years, being relegated in his second. He retired in June 1997, at age 33.

Post-retirement
Immediately after retiring, Martín González returned to Osasuna as an assistant coach and director of football (accumulating in some seasons). He was briefly fired in October 2003 but later returned, now in only the latter capacity; he occupied that position for several years, leaving the El Sadar Stadium in August 2013.

Martín González was appointed at Real Zaragoza of the second tier on 30 July 2014, still as a sporting director. In December of the following year, he left the club.

In the following years, in the same role, Martín González worked with Real Oviedo and Getafe CF.

References

External links

1964 births
Living people
Footballers from Madrid
Spanish footballers
Association football midfielders
La Liga players
Segunda División players
Real Madrid Castilla footballers
Real Madrid CF players
CA Osasuna players
Rayo Vallecano players
Spain youth international footballers
Spain under-21 international footballers